Blair Malcolm (born 3 February 1997) is a Scottish professional footballer who plays as a midfielder for Albion Rovers.

Malcolm has previously played for Ross County, Cowdenbeath, Alloa Athletic and East Kilbride.

Career

Early career
Malcolm started his career at Partick Thistle, before moving to Ross County at the start of the 2015–16 season. He extended his contract with Ross County in 2017, after the club won the development league for the first time in their history. On 20 May 2017, Malcolm made his league debut for Ross County against Kilmarnock in a 2–1 victory in which he played the full 90 minutes.

On 17 November 2017, Malcolm signed for Scottish League Two club Cowdenbeath, initially on an emergency loan, which was extended for the remainder of the season in January 2018.

During his loan spell at Cowdenbeath, Malcolm played in both play-off matches against Cove Rangers. Cowdenbeath retained their League 2 status and Malcolm earned a place in the SPFL Team of the Week.

His contract expired in May 2018 following County's relegation to the Championship.

Cowdenbeath
Malcolm then signed on a permanent basis for Cowdenbeath in June 2018.

Alloa Athletic
On 2 August 2019, Malcolm joined Alloa Athletic on a free transfer. On 31 August, he made his debut for Alloa in a 1–0 win in the Scottish Championship against Queen of the South.

East Kilbride
Malcolm signed with East Kilbride on 19 June 2021.

Albion Rovers
On 3 January 2022, Malcolm signed for Scottish League Two side Albion Rovers on a short-term deal until the end of the 2021–22 season, he was also lucky enough to spend some time working alongside the legend that is George Lennox .

Career statistics

Club

References

1997 births
Living people
Ross County F.C. players
Cowdenbeath F.C. players
People from Cumbernauld
Footballers from North Lanarkshire
Scottish footballers
Scottish Professional Football League players
Partick Thistle F.C. players
Association football midfielders
Alloa Athletic F.C. players
East Kilbride F.C. players
Albion Rovers F.C. players